The 2000 European Promotion Cup for Cadettes was the first edition of the basketball European Promotion Cup for cadettes, today known as FIBA U16 Women's European Championship Division C. It was played in Gibraltar from 19 to 23 July 2000. Cyprus women's national under-16 basketball team won the tournament.

Participating teams

Final standings

Results

References

2000
2000–01 in European women's basketball
FIBA U16
Sports competitions in Gibraltar
FIBA